The following is a compilation of notable records and statistics for teams and players in and seasons of Women's Professional Soccer.

WPS Winners and Runners-Up

WPS Championships

All-Time Scoring Leaders

All-Time Successes 

* Through 2011 regular seasonTiebreak for otherwise identical records is most recent success

All-Time Regular Season Records 

From 2009 season till 2011

*includes point deduction(s)

All-Time Playoffs Records 

From 2009 season till 2011

1Ties decided by shootoutSort order is Pts, appearance%, total seasons, finishing position

Average Season Attendances

Includes regular season games, playoffs, and All-Star matches; does not include friendlies

Trivia 

 The longest winning start to a season was achieved by both the Los Angeles Sol in 2009 and magicJack in 2011, with three wins each.
The longest winning end to a season was achieved by the Western New York Flash in 2011, who finished the season with five straight wins.
 The longest unbeaten start to a season was achieved by the Western New York Flash in 2011, who opened the campaign with eight unbeaten games (seven wins and one tie).
 The longest unbeaten end to a season was achieved by FC Gold Pride in 2010, who closed the campaign with thirteen unbeaten games (nine wins and four ties).
 Counting the 2011 season, no team has played in every playoff series.
 However, if magicJack is considered to be the same team as the Washington Freedom (as its continuation), that team has qualified for every postseason.
 Two core groups of players have played together in all three seasons and qualified for the playoffs - the Washington-magicJack core mentioned above, centered on Abby Wambach, and the Los Angeles-Gold Pride-Western New York core, centered on Marta.
The team to win the regular season title in both of the first two seasons has folded in the following offseason.
Also, the same can be said for each team to lead the league in attendance the first two seasons.

Notes 

Records and statistics
All-time football league tables
Association football league records and statistics
Women's association football records and statistics